The December 5–6, 2020 nor'easter  brought heavy snowfall, hurricane-force wind gusts, blizzard conditions, and coastal flooding to much of New England in the first few days of December 2020. The system originated on the Mid-Atlantic coast late on December 4. It then moved up the East Coast of the United States from December 5–6, bombing out and bringing heavy wet snow to the New England states.

The nor'easter caused over 280,000 power outages, mostly in Maine, in addition to causing several injuries. The system is estimated to have caused at least $25 million (2021 USD) in damage. It was unofficially named Winter Storm Eartha by The Weather Channel.

Meteorological history

The nor'easter originated as a weak frontal system over Alabama late on December 4. Several hours later, the system began to grow more organized, transitioning into an extratropical cyclone over North Carolina by 03:00 UTC on December 5. The system weakened slightly over New Brunswick, but began to weaken faster after emerging into the Gulf of Saint Lawrence. After this point, the low-pressure began to rapidly weaken, with the system dissipating inland over Newfoundland the next day.

Preparations and impact
Winter Storm Warnings were issued on December 4 and 5 in advance of heavy, wet snow and possible blizzard conditions across New England, including both Boston and Portland. Winter Weather Advisories were issued further south, and High Wind Warnings were placed into effect on Cape Cod in anticipation of hurricane-force wind gusts.

Southern New England

In Connecticut, near-whiteout conditions were reported for prolonged periods on December 5, leading to numerous crashes on interstates. I-84 was closed in both directions from Tolland, Connecticut, to the Massachusetts state line for hours as a result of numerous crashes and a lack of snowplows.

Massachusetts State Police lowered the speed limit to 40 mph on I-90 at noon on December 5 due to ongoing whiteout conditions on the roadways. A crash was reported on I-90 in Millbury a few hours later, prompting the closure of two lanes. Over 1,800 snow removal vehicles were deployed in Massachusetts to clear roads of snow and ice. Over 26,000 power outages resulted in Massachusetts, and several thousand of those were not restored until the next day.

Northern New England
The state recorded over 60,000 power outages, and most were not restored until December 6 or 7.

Meanwhile, Cranberry Isles reported sustained winds of  during the height of the storm. Maine also had the highest number of power outages, with 210,000 customers being put without power and some outages lasting for days. Much of Maine also faced whiteout and near-blizzard conditions for prolonged periods of time, resulting in numerous crashes on roadways.

See also

December 2009 North American blizzard
December 17–22, 2012 North American blizzard
March 2014 nor'easter
January 2016 United States blizzard
December 15–17, 2020 nor'easter
2021 Super Bowl Sunday nor'easter

References

External links
 2020 Storm Summaries from the Weather Prediction Center

Nor'easters
2020–21 North American winter
2020 in Massachusetts
December 2020 events in the United States
Extratropical cyclones